The Men's 3 metre Springboard, also reported as springboard diving, was one of four diving events on the Diving at the 1992 Summer Olympics programme.

The competition was split into two phases:

Preliminary round
The twelve divers with the highest scores advanced to the final.
Final
Divers performed a set of dives to determine the final ranking.

Results

See also
Diving at the 1991 World Aquatics Championships – Men's 1 metre springboard
Diving at the 1991 World Aquatics Championships – Men's 3 metre springboard

References

Sources
 

Men
1992
Men's events at the 1992 Summer Olympics